William Davidson Munro (born 21 June 1934 in Glasgow) is a Scottish former football player and manager. Munro played for Kilmarnock, Barrow and East Stirlingshire. He was appointed manager of Clydebank, owned by the Steedman family who had previously owned East Stirlingshire while Munro was a player there. Munro guided Clydebank to promotion to the Scottish Premier Division in 1977. He later managed Airdrie and also worked in women's football (at Cumbernauld Ladies).

Honours
Clydebank
Scottish First Division promotion 1976–77
Stirlingshire Cup : 1978–79, 1979–80

References

1934 births
Living people
Footballers from Glasgow
Scottish footballers
Association football inside forwards
Kilmarnock F.C. players
Barrow A.F.C. players
East Stirlingshire F.C. players
English Football League players
Scottish Football League players
Scottish football managers
Clydebank F.C. (1965) managers
Airdrieonians F.C. (1878) managers
Scottish Football League managers